Curmătura River may refer to the following rivers in Romania:

Curmătura, a tributary of the Latorița in Vâlcea County
Curmătura, a tributary of the Sitna in Botoșani County

See also 
Curmătura (disambiguation)